Ritz Azul-Guy (born Ritz Ann Riggie Villafuerte Alzul on January 11, 1994), is a Filipina actress and television hostess known for her work as a talent of TV5 and later ABS-CBN through Star Magic.

Early life and career
Although born in Pampanga, Azul later moved to Quezon City. She initially gained notice through TV5's talent search program Star Factor, where she ended up being the 4th Final Star. She took up Bachelor of Science in Accountancy at the Lyceum of the Philippines University, but took a break from her studies to concentrate on her showbusiness career. Today, she is one of TV5's Primetime Princesses, along with Danita Paner, Arci Muñoz, Jasmine Curtis and Eula Caballero. But in 2016 she inked her 2-year exclusive contract under Star Magic and ABS-CBN Management, guesting on the hit prime time TV series FPJ's Ang Probinsyano topbilled by Coco Martin. She is also currently a star on her first ever teleserye on ABS-CBN titled The Promise of Forever alongside her leading men Paulo Avelino and Ejay Falcon.

Personal life
Ritz Azul was the Sangguniang Kabataan Chairwoman in her native town of Dila Dila in Santa Rita, Pampanga from 2010 to 2013.

Ritz Azul married her partner Allan Guy on November 20, 2021.

Filmography

Television shows

Film

Awards and nominations

FHM 100 Sexiest Woman

References

External links

1994 births
Living people
ABS-CBN personalities
Actresses from Pampanga
Filipino child actresses
Filipino television actresses
Lyceum of the Philippines University alumni
People from Quezon City
Star Magic
TV5 (Philippine TV network) personalities